Norman George Corbett (23 June 1919 – June 1990) was a Scottish footballer who played as a right-half.

Career
Born in Camelon, Falkirk, as a schoolboy Corbett captained the Falkirk team that won the Scottish Schools Trophy. He also played for Scotland Boys. He signed for Heart of Midlothian at the age of 15 although never played a competitive first team game for the Edinburgh club. While farmed out at Musselburgh Athletic, he played for Scotland Juniors three times (including twice as captain, the youngest-ever player to do so).

Corbett played for West Ham United between April 1937 and 1950. In a career that was badly affected by World War II, he made a total of 306 appearances for the club, including war competitions, scoring eight goals. He won a Football League War Cup winners medal in 1940, although he did not appear in the final, and was an ever-present for the Irons during the 1947–48 season.

After the outbreak of the war, Corbett served as a volunteer with the Essex Regiment, and guested for Southampton.

Corbett played his last League game for West Ham against Cardiff City on 15 April 1950, and appeared only for the reserve team after that. He later became a coach and joined Clapton.

Norman Corbett was brother of Hammers player David (who was also a right-half) and Willie, who guested for the club during World War II.

References

External links
Norman Corbett at Spartacus Educational

1919 births
1990 deaths
Scottish military personnel
Scottish footballers
Heart of Midlothian F.C. players
Musselburgh Athletic F.C. players
Scottish Junior Football Association players
Scotland junior international footballers
English Football League players
West Ham United F.C. players
Southampton F.C. wartime guest players
Falkirk F.C. wartime guest players
West Ham United F.C. non-playing staff
Footballers from Falkirk (council area)
Association football wing halves
Essex Regiment soldiers
British Army personnel of World War II
Association football coaches